The Tapley Mountains is a mountain range fronting on the eastern side of the Scott Glacier, extending eastward for  between Leverett and Albanus glaciers in the Queen Maud Mountains, a part of the larger Transantarctic Mountains.

Discovered in December 1929 by the Byrd Antarctic Expedition geological party under Laurence McKinley Gould, and named by Byrd for Harold Tapley of Dunedin, New Zealand, agent for the Byrd AE of 1928–30 and 1933–35.

Features 
Geographical features include:

 Albanus Glacier
 Bobo Ridge
 Durham Point
 Evans Butte
 Leverett Glacier
 Mount Andes
 Mount Bushnell
 Mount Durham
 Mount Herr
 Mount Seebeck
 Mount Stahlman
 Mount Wallace
 Pincer Point
 Roe Glacier
 Scott Glacier

Further reading 
 Gunter Faure, Teresa M. Mensing, The Transantarctic Mountains: Rocks, Ice, Meteorites and Water, P 183

References 

Mountains of Marie Byrd Land
Mountains of the Ross Dependency
Queen Maud Mountains
Gould Coast